The Ministry of Infrastructure and Water Management (I&W) is the Dutch Ministry responsible for transport, aviation, housing policy, public works, spatial planning, land management and water resource management. The Ministry was created in 2010 as the Ministry of Infrastructure and the Environment following the merger of the Ministry of Transport and Water Management and the Ministry of Housing, Spatial Planning and Environment. In 2017, the Ministry was renamed the Ministry of Infrastructure and Water Management and the responsibilities for environmental policy and climate change policy were transferred to the Ministry of Economic Affairs.

The Minister of Infrastructure and Water Management is the head of the Ministry and a member of the Cabinet of the Netherlands. The current Minister is Mark Harbers, serving since 10 January 2022.

Organisation
The Ministry has currently two Government Agencies and three Directorates:

 Directorate for Mobility and Transport (DGB)
 Directorate for Spatial Development and Water Affairs (DGRW)
 Directorate for Knowledge, Innovation and Strategy

See also
 List of Ministers of Infrastructure of the Netherlands

References

External links
 Ministry of Infrastructure and Water Management

Infrastructure and Water Management
Netherlands
Netherlands
Netherlands
Netherlands
Netherlands
Netherlands
Netherlands
Netherlands
Netherlands
Netherlands
Netherlands
Netherlands
Netherlands
Housing in the Netherlands
Netherlands
Netherlands, Infrastructure and Water Management
2010 establishments in the Netherlands
Transport organisations based in the Netherlands
Aviation organisations based in the Netherlands